Euboea is one of the regional units of Greece. It is part of the administrative region of Central Greece. It consists of the islands of Euboea and Skyros, as well as a 260 km² area on the Greek mainland. Its land area is 4,167.449 km², whereas the total land area of the municipalities actually on the island Euboea is 3,684.848 km², which includes that of numerous small offshore islets (Petalies Islands) near Euboea's southern tip.

Administration

The Euboea regional unit is subdivided into 8 municipalities, numbered in the picture in the infobox. These are:
Chalcis (Chalkida, 1)  
Dirfys-Messapia (2)
Eretria (3)
Istiaia-Aidipsos (4)
Karystos (5)
Kymi-Aliveri (6)
Mantoudi-Limni-Agia Anna (7)
Skyros (8)

Prefecture

As a part of the 2011 Kallikratis government reform, the former Euboea Prefecture  was transformed into a regional unit within the Central Greece region, without any change in boundaries. At the same time, the municipalities were reorganised, according to the table below.

Note: the former municipalities of Anthidona and Avlida are on the mainland, attached to the northeastern part of Boeotia. Skyros is an island by itself.

Provinces
 Chalkida Province - Chalkida
 Istiaeotis Province - Istiaia
 Karystiaea Province - Karystos
Note: Provinces no longer hold any legal status in Greece.

Population

As of the 2001 census, the prefecture had a population of 215,136 inhabitants, and the island Euboea itself had a population of 198,130.

References

 
Prefectures of Greece
1833 establishments in Greece
Regional units of Central Greece